Sykes' monkey (Cercopithecus albogularis), also known as the white-throated monkey or Samango monkey, is an Old World monkey found between Ethiopia and South Africa, including south and east Democratic Republic of Congo. It is named after English naturalist Colonel William Henry Sykes (1790-1872), and has been considered conspecific with the blue monkey (which in turn has included the golden and silver monkey), but has a large white patch on the throat and upper chest, and a grizzled (not blackish) cap.

Subspecies
The 12 subspecies of Sykes' monkey are:
 C. a. albogularis – Zanzibar Sykes' monkey
 C. a. albotorquatus – Pousargues' Sykes' monkey
 C. a. erythrarchus – white-throated guenon
 C. a. francescae
 C. a. kibonotensis
 C. a. kolbi - Mount Kenya Sykes' monkey
 C. a. labiatus – White-lipped monkey or Samango monkey
 C. a. moloneyi
 C. a. monoides
 C. a. phylax
 C. a. schwarzi
 C. a. zammaranoi – Zammarano's white-throated guenon

References

External links

Sykes' monkey
Mammals of Ethiopia
Mammals of the Democratic Republic of the Congo
Mammals of Zambia
Mammals of Tanzania
Mammals of South Africa
Taxa named by William Henry Sykes
Sykes' monkey
Taxobox binomials not recognized by IUCN